Extreme Machines was a documentary series created by Pioneer Productions for The Learning Channel and Discovery Channel. The series focused mainly on machines although in some episodes of Season 4 and Season 5, it also looked at disasters involving them. The series was largely narrated by William Hootkins. The show made also made use of scale miniatures in many episodes, managed by David Barlow.

Episodes

Season 1 (1997)

Season 2 (1998)

Season 3 (1999)

Season 4 (2000)

Season 5 (2001)

References 

1997 American television series debuts
Discovery Channel original programming
TLC (TV network) original programming
1990s American documentary television series